Adiyozhukkukal is a 1984 Indian Malayalam-language drama film directed by I. V. Sasi and written by  M. T. Vasudevan Nair; starring Mammootty, Mohanlal, Seema, Balan K. Nair, Vincent and Rahman. The film was produced by Raju Mathew under the banner of Casino and was distributed by Century Films.

Mammootty received the Kerala State Film Award for Best Actor for his performance as Karunan, and Jayanan Vincent won the award for Best Cinematography. The film was a critical and commercial success. Later it was remade Tamil as Vanna Kanavugal, with Karthik, Murali and Jayashree. Critics consider Mammootty's portrayal of Karunan in the film as one of the finest in his early career.

Plot 
Karunan (Mammootty) is an arrogant fisherman back from jail after 5 years. Upon arriving back at his coastal village, he finds much has changed. Chandran (Rahman), his trusted Lieutenant, who is more like a younger brother is now a worker at the nearby toddy shop. Chandran again joins him and helps Karunan in setting up his life. Karunan is shocked to see that Madhavi (Menaka), whom he loved once is now married to Kumaran (Vincent), for whom he had to go to jail. Kumaran ditched Karunan and within a short time, he himself has emerged as a rich man in the locality. Karunan decides to avenge Kumaran, but is attacked severely at night by his goons. Karunan is saved by Gopi (Mohanlal), a jobless young man who accidentally witnesses the incident. Gopi becomes a good friend of Karunan and starts staying with him and Chandran. In the meantime Devayani (Seema) a young woman, also joins them due to unexpected situations. The unpleasant incidents happening in each of their lives and Karunan's fight against Kumaran forms the rest of the story.

Cast 

 Mammootty as Karunan, an arrogant fisherman
 Mohanlal as Gopi, the man who saves Karunan
 Seema as Devyani, who joins Karunan
 Rahman as Chandran, Karunan's friend
 Vincent as Kumaran Mooppan, the villain
 Menaka as Madhavi
 Sukumari as Radha
 Manianpilla Raju as Jayarajan
 Sankaradi as Josephettan
 Manavalan Joseph
 Bahadoor as Kunjikka
 Sathaar as Narayanan
 Paravoor Bharathan
 Kuthiravattam Pappu as Sivankutty
 Kundara Johny as Govindan
 Janardhanan as Hamsa
 Kaviyoor Ponnamma as Mariyamachedathi
Sunitha Sharma as Karthiyaani

Crew 
 Cinematography: Jayanan Vincent
 Editing: K. Narayanan
 Makeup: M. O. Devassya
 Costumes: M. M. Kumar
 Stunts: Thyagaragan
 Advertisement: P. N. Menon
 Processing: Vijaya Colour Lab
 Stills: Ansari
 Associate Director: Jomon
 Assistant Director: Anil Kumar
 Co-producers: Mammootty, Mohanlal, I. V. Sasi, Seema

Awards 
 Mammootty won the 1984 Kerala State Film Award for Best Actor and Filmfare Award.
 Jayanan Vincent won the 1984 Kerala State Film Award for Best Photography.

Box office 
The film was a commercial success.

References

External links 
 

1984 films
1980s Malayalam-language films
Films with screenplays by M. T. Vasudevan Nair
Malayalam films remade in other languages
Indian drama films
Films directed by I. V. Sasi
Films scored by Shyam (composer)